This is a list of Superleague Formula circuits, that is a list of circuits which have hosted at least one round of the Superleague Formula championship since 2008. In total, 17 different circuits from nine countries have hosted a race weekend. The first to do so was Donington Park, where the first races, at the 2008 Donington Park Superleague Formula round, were held. The Ordos International Circuit was the first circuit outside Europe to host a Superleague Formula event. Only the circuit of Circuit Zolder in Belgium has hosted races in every season until now. On 2011 season, just two races were held; then the series was discontinued after just four seasons of racing.

Circuits

References

External links
 Superleague Formula Official Website
 V12 Racing: Independent Superleague Formula Fansite Magazine

Circuits
Superleague Formula